E is the fifth letter of the Latin alphabet.

E or e may also refer to:

Computing and computation 
 E (1970s text editor), a text editor developed at the Stanford AI Lab in the 1970s
 E (complexity), a set of decision problems solvable by a Turing machine in a specific time
 /e/ (operating system), a fork of LineageOS, which in turn is based on Android
 E (PC DOS), a text editor
 E (programming language), an object-oriented programming language
 E (theorem prover), a modern, high performance prover for first-order logic
 e (verification language) hardware verification language
 Amiga E, a programming language
 E or Enlightenment (software), a free software open source manager for X Window System

Commerce and transportation 
 €, the symbol for the euro, the European Union's standard currency unit
 ℮, the estimated sign, an EU symbol indicating that the weight or volume of pre-packaged goods is within specific allowable tolerances
 E, the country identifier for vehicle registration plates of Spain
 E, a Polish electric locomotive in PKP classification system
 E or Eni, an Italian oil and gas company
 E-Mark, an approval mark for automotive products in Europe under the World Forum for Harmonization of Vehicle Regulations
 E (Los Angeles Railway)
 E (New York City Subway service), a subway service in New York
 E Line (Los Angeles Metro) 
 Line E (Buenos Aires Underground) of the Buenos Aires Subte

Geography 
 E or east, one of the four cardinal directions
 E (state), a vassal state in Zhou Dynasty China (1046–256 BC)
 E Township, Maine, an unincorporated community in USA
 Mount E, a stratovolcano on Oshima Peninsula, Japan
 River E, a river in Scotland
 E postcode area, for east London
 E, New Brunswick's postal code
 Hubei, abbreviated in Chinese as È (鄂), a province of China

Languages 
 É (temple), Sumerian word for house or temple
 E language, a language of China
 E, the Spivak pronoun meaning "he" or "she"

Letters and other characters 
 Ⓔ or ⓔ or (e) or (E) - circled-E or circled-E, see Enclosed Alphanumerics
 Latin E with diacritic:
 É or é - e-acute, an accented letter of many Latin alphabets.
 È or è - e-grave, another accented letter of many Latin alphabets
 Ê or ê - e  with circumflex
 Ë or ë - e with trema (diaeresis or umlaut)
 Ē or ē - e with macron
 e, the close-mid front unrounded vowel IPA symbol
Tifinagh letter ⴹ
 Е and е, a letter of the Cyrillic alphabet
 Ε and ε, the letter epsilon in the Greek alphabet

Mathematics and logic 
 e (mathematical constant), a mathematical constant also known as Euler's number and Napier's constant
 E notation, or scientific notation, a way of writing very large and very small numbers such as 5E7
 ∃ (a backwards E; U+2203) or existential quantification, the symbol for "there exists...", in predicate logic
 ∃!, meaning "there exists only one" (or "there exists exactly one"), see Uniqueness quantification
 E, 14 in hexadecimal and other positional numeral systems of a base of 15 or higher
  or expected value, the average expected outcome of a trial in probability theory
 , the complete elliptic integral of the second kind
 , the identity element
 , the Erdős–Borwein_constant

Medicine and genetics 
 E number, a number code for a food additive, an EU labelling requirement
 Haplogroup E (mtDNA), a human mitochondrial DNA (mtDNA) haplogroup
 Haplogroup E (Y-DNA), a Y-chromosomal DNA (Y-DNA) haplogroup
 E (or Glu), an abbreviation for glutamic acid or glutamate
 Vitamin E or Tocopherol, a class of chemical compounds
 The symbol for the hormone epinephrine
 E, a common abbreviation for 'Ecstasy' (a familiar name for the psychoactive recreational drug MDMA)
Ethambutol
Estradiol (medication), particularly in transgender contexts

Music 
 E (musical note)
 E major, a scale
 E minor, a scale
 E major chord, see Chord names and symbols (popular music)
 E (video), by Eminem
 E (Adrian Belew album), 2009
 É (album), by Duda Brack, 2015
 E (Enslaved album), 2017
 E (Epik High album), 2009
 E (single album), by Big Bang, 2015
 E, a 2019 album by Ecco2K
 "E", a song by Baboon from Sausage, 1992

People 
 E (surname), Chinese surname
 E, a nickname of Mark Oliver Everett, musician and front man of the rock band Eels
 e, a nickname of Eric Neustadter, Former Operations Manager for Xbox Live and frequent co-host of the "Major Nelson Radio" podcast
 Mr. E (disambiguation)

Physics and engineering 
 e (or e−) or electron, a fundamental subatomic particle
 e or elementary charge, the absolute value of the electric charge carried by a single electron. 
 e or coefficient of restitution (COR), a measure of the elasticity of a collision in mechanics
 E, the symbol for energy in equations concerning mass-energy equivalence
 E or Young's modulus, a measure of stiffness in solid mechanics
 E or exa-, the SI prefix for 1018
 E-layer or the Kennelly-Heaviside layer, part of the ionosphere
 E, the symbol for an electric field
 e or orbital eccentricity, a measure of how much a conic section deviates from a circle
 E or Equal Energy spectrum, a definition of white in colour printing
 E, the electrode potential, the electromotive force of a cell built of two electrodes

Television and film 
 E!, Entertainment Television, an American cable and satellite TV network
E! (Australia and New Zealand), the defunct Australian and New Zealand version of American E!
 E! (Canada):
 E! (Canadian TV system), a defunct over-the-air television system operated by Canwest from 2001 to 2009 (originally known as CH until 2007)
 E! (Canadian TV channel), a Canadian cable/satellite specialty channel owned by Bell Media that launched in November 2010.
 E (2006 film), a 2006 Tamil film
 E (2017 film)
 E, or Edna Mode, a character from the movie The Incredibles
 E, or Eric Murphy, a character from the television series Entourage
E, the production code for the 1964 Doctor Who serial The Keys of Marinus

Other uses

 e (novel), a 2000 comic novel by Matt Beaumont
 E band (disambiguation)
 E#, a team's elimination number
 E, or the Elohist, one of the four sources of the Torah
 E, or Everyone, a video game rating symbol used by the Entertainment Software Rating Board which is suitable for all ages. 
 Dominical letter E for a common year starting on Wednesday
 E-Z notation, to indicate double bonds that two groups of higher priority are on opposite sides.
 E or EDGE, for Enhanced Data Rates for GSM Evolution
 E, or Eredivisie, The Symbol Of The Eredivisie Logo

See also 
 Eta
 Big E (disambiguation)
 Block E (disambiguation)
 Class E (disambiguation)
 E class (disambiguation)
 E number (disambiguation)
 E-Series (disambiguation)
 E-Type (disambiguation)
 E! (disambiguation)
 Formula E (disambiguation)
 Group E (disambiguation)
 Model E (disambiguation)
 Open E (disambiguation)